Little Tokyo Live (リトルトーキョーライフ Ritorutōkyōraifu) is a Japanese variety show, aired every Wednesday around 23:58 on TV Tokyo. Hosts of the show are members of Hey! Say! JUMP and Johnny's West, who take turns presenting the show. It's aired since October, 2014.

TV Tokyo original programming